Dzongkha, the national language of Bhutan, has two numeral systems, one vigesimal (base 20), and a modern decimal system. The vigesimal system remains in robust use. Ten is an auxiliary base: the -teens are formed with ten and the numerals 1–9. Ex. cu_ci

Vigesimal

*When it appears on its own, 'ten' is usually said  'a full ten'. In combinations it is simply . 

Intermediate factors of ten are formed with  'half to': 

400 (20²)  is the next unit:  400,  800, etc. Higher powers are 8000 (20³)  ('a ɡreat score') and  160,000 (20⁴).

Decimal
The decimal system is the same up to 19. Then decades, however, are formed as unit–ten, as in Chinese, and the hundreds similarly. 20 is reported to be , the same as vigesimal numeral 400; this may be lexical interference for the expected . (In any case, there is no ambiguity, because as 400 it is obligatorily  'one 400'.) Several of the decades have an epenthetic , perhaps by analogy with 18 and 19, where the  presumably reflects a historical  'ten': 

 30,  40,  50,  or  100 (a 'full hundred' or 'one hundred'),  200,  300,  400, etc.

References
Mazaudon & Lacito, 2002, "Les principes de construction du nombre dans les langues tibeto-birmanes", in François, ed. La Pluralité, p. 6 ff

Dzongkha language
Numerals